The 1963 UCI Road World Championships took place from 10 to 11 August 1963 in Ronse, Belgium.

Results

Medal table

External links 

 Men's results
 Women's results
  Results at sportpro.it

 
UCI Road World Championships by year
UCI Road World Championships 1963
Uci Road World Championships, 1963
1963 in road cycling